Science Friction may refer to

 Science Friction (album) by Tim Berne
 "Science Friction" (song), from the 1977 XTC album 3D EP
 Science Friction (record label), established by Roy Harper in 1993
 Science Friction (book) book by Michael Shermer
 "Science Friction!", a 1989 episode of The Raccoons

See also
 Science fiction (disambiguation)